Eoin Kelly may refer to:

 Eoin Kelly (Tipperary hurler) (born 1982), Tipperary hurler
 Eoin Kelly (Waterford hurler) (born 1982), Waterford hurler
 Eoin Kelly (London hurler)